Dike–New Hartford Community School District (DNH) is a rural public school district headquartered in Dike, Iowa.

The district is mostly in Grundy and Butler counties, with sections in Black Hawk County. It serves Dike, New Hartford, and Stout.

It was established on July 1, 1996, by the merger of the Dike and New Hartford school districts.

Schools
Its schools include:
 Dike–New Hartford High School (grades 9–12)
 Dike–New Hartford Junior High School (6–8)
 New Hartford Elementary School (pre-kindergarten to grade 2 and grade 5)
 Dike Elementary School (pre-kindergarten through 4th grade)

In 2020, alumnus Travis Druvenga agreed to become the high school principal of Dike–New Hartford.

Dike–New Hartford High School

Athletics
The Wolverines compete in the North Iowa Cedar League Conference in the following sports:

Cross country 
Volleyball
 9-time state champions (1994, 1997, 2011, 2012, 2013, 2014, 2016, 2017, 2020)
Football
Basketball 
Wrestling 
Track and field 
Men's Golf 
Women's Golf
 2014 Class 2A State Champions
Soccer 
Tennis 
Baseball
Softball

See also
List of school districts in Iowa
List of high schools in Iowa

References

External links
 Dike–New Hartford Community School District
 

School districts in Iowa
Education in Black Hawk County, Iowa
Education in Butler County, Iowa
Education in Grundy County, Iowa
1996 establishments in Iowa
School districts established in 1996